Cole Township may refer to:

 Cole Township, Sebastian County, Arkansas, in Sebastian County, Arkansas
 Cole Township, Benton County, Missouri

Township name disambiguation pages